was a Japanese serial killer. He murdered his own mother in 2000, was imprisoned, and then paroled in 2003. In 2005, two years after his release, he raped and then murdered a 27-year-old woman and her 19-year-old sister, for which he was sentenced to death. He was executed in 2009.

Biography
Yamaji was born into a poor family. His father died of cirrhosis in January 1995. After graduating from junior high school, he dropped out and began working at a newspaper store.

Matricide
Yamaji killed his 50-year-old mother with a metal baseball bat in Yamaguchi city, Yamaguchi Prefecture at age 16 on July 29, 2000. He called the police and was arrested on July 31, 2000. He stated that his motives to commit matricide were his mother's silent telephone calls to the woman with whom he had fallen in love and his mother's mounting debt. He was paroled in October 2003.

Double homicide
On November 17, 2005, Yamaji raped and murdered a 27-year-old woman named Asuka Uehara and her 19-year-old sister, Chihiro, with a knife, in Naniwa, Osaka. He then set fire to their apartment and fled.The two victims had never met Yamaji before. He was arrested on December 5, 2005. While in custody, he stated to the Osaka police, "I could not forget the feeling when I killed my mother, and wanted to see human blood."

Sentence
On December 13, 2006, the Osaka District Court sentenced him to death. His defense launched an appeal, but according to his lawyers he retracted it because he was reluctant to pursue leniency. He was executed at the Osaka Detention House alongside Japanese serial killer Hiroshi Maeue on July 28, 2009.

See also
 List of executions in Japan
 List of serial killers by country
 Matricide

References

External links
  山地悠紀夫事件

1983 births
2000 murders in Japan
2005 murders in Japan
2009 deaths
21st-century executions by Japan
Executed Japanese serial killers
Japanese people convicted of murder
Japanese rapists
Male serial killers
Matricides
Minors convicted of murder
People executed by Japan by hanging
People convicted of murder by Japan
People executed for murder